The NATO Open Source Intelligence Reader is one of three standard references on open-source intelligence.  The other two are the NATO Open Source Intelligence Handbook and the NATO Intelligence Exploitation of the Internet.

Sources
NATO Open Source Intelligence Reader

Open-source intelligence